Triumph in the Skies is a 2015 Hong Kong-Chinese romantic drama film directed by Wilson Yip and Matt Chow and starring Louis Koo, Sammi Cheng, Francis Ng, Julian Cheung, Charmaine Sheh, Amber Kuo, Océane Zhu and Dean Liu. The film is an adaptation of the Triumph in the Skies television series. Production started on 6 August 2014. The film was released on February 19, 2015.

Synopsis
Young pilot Branson (Louis Koo) takes over Skylette Airlines, his father's aviation empire, only to realize that his old flame Cassie (Charmaine Sheh) is a flight attendant there. Several years previously, he was forced to break up with her and move to New York to take care of his father's business. To this day, the two continue to harbour feelings for each other but decide to keep them bottled up.

In an effort to rebrand the airline, Branson invites rock idol TM (Sammi Cheng) to star in an upcoming commercial and appoints Sam (Francis Ng) as her flying consultant. Incongruent in both tastes and experience, this odd couple gets off on the wrong foot. However, as the shoot progresses they slowly discover each other's merits, developing a strong mutual attraction.

Jayden (Julian Cheung) having left Skylette, to become a pilot of private jets, meets the young and vivacious Kika (Amber Kuo) during a flight and assumes her to be wayward and shallow. But they turn out to have a lot in common and start falling madly in love. At the height of their romance, Jayden realizes almost too late the secret behind her recalcitrance...

Each of the three relationships comes with its own setbacks. As long as one can accept the imperfection of things, finding happiness—however fleetingly—is a blessing in itself.

Cast
 Louis Koo as Branson Cheung (張春亮)
 Sammi Cheng as TM Tam (譚夢)
 Francis Ng as Samuel "Sam" Tong (唐亦琛)
 Julian Cheung as Jayden "Captain Cool" Koo (顧夏陽)
 Charmaine Sheh as Cassie Poon (潘家詩)
 Amber Kuo as Kika Sit (薛健雅)
 Océane Zhu as Winnie
 Dean Liu as Tony
 Kenneth Ma as Roy Ko (高志宏)
 Elena Kong as Heather Fong (方芮嘉)
 Jun Kung as TM's manager
 Ma Jin as Thomas
 Liao Jingsheng as Branson's father
 Yiming Ma as Thomas' friend

Box office
The film has earned US$24.59 million in China and HK$21.5 million (US$2.78 million) in Hong Kong.

Song list
 "歲月如歌" by Eason Chan
 "How Much Will We Remember" by The Pancakes
 "I Hate You But I Love You" by Pollie Tong
 "I Hate You But I Love You" by Janet Yung and Subyub Lee
 "Somewhere Over the Rainbow" by Sammi Cheng
 "Hold on, Watch on" by Tomii Chan
 "Invoice of Love" by Subyub Lee
 "Reach for a Star" by Janet Yung
 "Slam the Ball" by Shawn Wong
 "Breathless Moment" by Janet Yung
 "Oh Boy" by Subyub Lee
 "最後一個" composed by Alan Wong and Janet Yung
 "She Knocked My Door" composed by Tomii Chan

References

External links
 

Hong Kong romantic drama films
2015 romantic drama films
Chinese aviation films
2010s Cantonese-language films
Films directed by Wilson Yip
Films directed by Matt Chow
Media Asia films
Shaw Brothers Studio films
Films based on television series
Films shot in Surrey
Films shot in Beijing
Films shot in Belgium
2010s Hong Kong films